General elections were held in Burma on 6 February 1960 to install a government to take over from General Ne Win's interim administration, established in October 1958. The military-led administration was credited for bringing stability and improving infrastructure in the country, though it suppressed some civil liberties.

The elections were seen as not so much a contest between the Clean AFPFL of U Nu against the Stable AFPFL of Kyaw Nyein and Ba Swe, but a referendum on the policies of the interim military government between 1958 and 1960. The result was a victory for the Clean AFPFL, which won 157 of the 250 seats in the Chamber of Deputies.

The elections set a precedent to other Middle Eastern and South Asian leaders, where the military voluntarily handed over to a civilian government and held free elections. However, only two years after his election victory, U Nu was overthrown in a coup d'état led by General Ne Win on 2 March 1962.

Campaign
The Clean AFPFL, led by U Nu, and Stable AFPFL, led by U Kyaw Nyein and U Ba Swe, had been formed after a split in the main AFPFL party in June 1958. Until the military took over in October 1958, U Nu relied on the communists to retain a majority in parliament.

Despite the formation of the two parties, there were no major ideological differences between them and their policies were similar, especially with regards to non-alignment, although the Stable faction favoured industrialisation and the Clean faction spoke more of agricultural development. The Stable faction had given the impression it was favoured by the army, but, after realising the army was not as favoured as first thought, distanced itself. It had also argued it represented stability. Meanwhile, the "Clean" faction warned against the "dangers of fascist dictatorship", and criticised the current leaders for their "drinking and womanising". The communist NUF was severely repressed by the caretaker military government and was therefore outside the two main parties.

The Clean AFPFL chose yellow to campaign, as it was the colour worn by monks, while the Stable AFPFL chose red and the National United Front chose blue.

Conduct
An estimated 10,000,000 Burmese were eligible to vote. The military largely stayed away on voting day, although it was present at some ballot boxes. Boxes for the "Clean" faction featured pictures of U Nu which the "Stable" faction and other smaller parties alleged confused the voter into thinking they were voting for Nu personally. Polls closed at 6 pm and a crowd estimated at 20,000 gathered at the Sule Pagoda in the capital Rangoon to hear results as they were posted. The "Clean" faction took all 9 seats in the capital including one they were prepared to concede, while the "Stable" faction had some strength in the countryside.

Media coverage of the event was restricted to print media only and vigorously covered, but was largely ignored by the state-run Burma Broadcasting Service which had not aired opposition coverage since before the AFPFL split.

Results
Voter turnout was the highest in a Burmese election. U Nu, remarking on his victory, said "I guess people like us".

Chamber of Deputies

Chamber of Nationalities

References

Elections in Myanmar
1960 in Burma
Burma
February 1960 events
Election and referendum articles with incomplete results